Claudiu David is a former Romanian Rally driver. He is now a mentor for high-performers, working with people who have already achieved what only a few people on the planet can, in a bespoke journey, to accomplish what is still missing in their life. Claudiu David  has a degree in exponential coaching. He has work experience with Olympic athletes at the National Institute of Sport Research. He is very passionate about Astrosophy. His tools used to work with are philosophy, Christianity, anthroposophy, situational meditation.

Career

Romanian Rally Championship 
Born in Sinaia, (7 December 1978), a town and ski resort in Romania, David became a multiple-class champion in the Romanian rally championship. He drove his first four-wheel drive season in 2006 and finished runner-up by only one championship point. In 2008, he had to retire prematurely from the national championship due to the lack of sponsors, although he had scored one victory and two-second places out of the five rallies he raced in.

World Rally Championship 
David was selected, due to his strong performances in the national championship, to race three rounds of the 2007 World Rally Championship (WRC) in the P-WRC category: Rally Argentina, Rally Japan and Rally GB. A year before, he was selected to drive in Rally Australia. Still, he could not attend the event due to a Romanian Racing Federations conflict that left him without an international license. In 2007, for the three rounds of the WRC, the car was a Group N Mitsubishi Lancer Evo IX prepared by the Stohl Racing team from Austria and entered in the OMV Bixxol Rally Team program for the promotion of young talents from Eastern Europe. At the end of the year his main sponsor, the OMV Group, retired from motorsports, which left David without financial support.

Circuit racing 
In 2007, David competed in circuit racing in the first ever FIA-GT race organized in the streets of Bucharest. He won the manufacturer's Dodge cup.

Hungarian Rally Championship 
On 1 August 2009, David obtained a group N win on his first appearance in the Hungarian Rally Championship; the 42nd Allianz Rallye at Pecs (tarmac). Driving the Mitsubishi Lancer Evo IX prepared by the local team Topp Cars, he won the gr N class (and was 4th overall behind three WRC cars) by 0.9 seconds.

American Rally Championship 
On January 23–24, David contested his first official rally in the USRC (United States Rally Championship): Winter Rally New York. After two days of racing on very difficult conditions (icy and snow-covered roads), he won his category (2WD – 2-wheel drive) and finished on the podium of the overall standings (3rd) on a Mazda 3 Turbo.

BMW Driving Academy 
After ending his rally career, his main purpose became to instill knowledge from all his peak performance moments acquired as a result of his top talent, and to share it with drivers from all over the world in pursuance of significantly enhance the safety on the roads. His passion for his work and because he loved what he did, gave him a steady source of motivation to be the best. Therefore, Claudiu David, in 2011, became one of the only five BMW Train the Trainers in the world of the BMW Driving Academy in Maisach, Germany. For more than 10 years, he implemented driving trainings and experiences worldwide. He has been coaching worldwide instructors for passenger car training; he delivered the BMW Group Driving Experiences' approach of how to design and deliver training; he developed brand-specific instructors; he improved instructors skills and competencies based on BMW Group instructor competency profiles.

He successfully managed and implemented for the BMW Driving Experience team more than 3000 Driving Experiences internationally, such as:

 BMW Driving Experiences in Namibia from 2011 to 2020;
 BMW Driving Experiences in South Africa from 2011 to 2020;
 BMW Advanced Driver Training in Asia: Korea, Singapore, China, Taiwan;
 BMW M Power Experience 2011 Spain for the new M5 launch – Ascari race track;
 BMW BMW Advanced Driver Training in Spain (Ascari, Catalunya, Jerez), Portugal (Portimao), Germany (Nurburgring, Hockenheimring), Italy (Florio), Czech Republic (Brno), Turkey (Istanbul Park), Holland (Zandvoort), Singapore, China, Abu Dhabi (Yas Marina);
 BMW 3 Series launch in Portimao race track - Portugal;
 BMW M Power Experience India on the F1 Buddh International race track;
 BMW prelaunch for M6 and M 135i in Spain – Ascari race track;
 BMW M Power Experience 2012 – Abu Dhabi on F1 Yas Marina Circuit for the new M6 launch;
 BMW Driving Experience in Abu Dhabi dessert with X5M and X6M;
 BMW Advanced Driver Training in Taiwan;
 BMW Advanced Driver Training in Vietnam;
 BMW official shooting in SUA, Canada, Spain, Portugal;
 BMW M6 Gran Coupe launch on the BMW M Track Days – Malaysia F1 Race Track of Sepang;
 The first BMW Driver Trainer in Romania.

Mentorship / Exponential Coaching 
Claudiu David has a degree in Exponential Coaching. Today, he serves extraordinary top performers (National Institute of Sport Research) in a bespoke journey, people who have already achieved what only a few people on the planet can, to accomplish what is still missing in their life, and what still looks impossible to them. He accompanies the most successful and talented people on the planet. He is an expert in supporting high achievers to the greatest level of success. He works now only with successful people and his main tools are mentoring, consultancy, teaching, and performance coaching, acting as a trusted advisor. Claudiu David is a high performer.

Results 

 2010: USRC (United States Rally Championship). Round 1: New York Winter Rally (snow and ice) – winner of the 2-wheel-drive category (2WD), 3rd in the overall rally standings, behind two 4WD cars – Mazda 3 Turbo.
 2009: two rallies in the Romanian Championship (Timișoara and Iasi); 1 Rallye in the Hungarian Championship: 42nd Allianz Rallye Pecs – winner of the gr N (4th overall) – Mitsubishi Lancer Evo IX.
 2008: five rallies in the Romanian Championship, 1 win (Cluj – tarmac), 2 podiums (Brasov – tarmac, Sibiu – gravel) – Mitsubishi Lancer Evo IX.
 2007: three rallies in the FIA World Rally Championship (Argentina, Japan, and Wales Rally GB), P-WRC category; one rally in the FIA European Championship (Waltviertel, Austria) – Mitsubishi Lancer Evo IX; one circuit race in FIA-GT3, Bucharest Challenge (Dodge Viper GT3).
 2006: runner-up in the Romanian Rally Championship, at 1 point behind the first place, two wins (Piatra Neamt, Brasov – gravel) – Mitsubishi Lancer Evo VII, the first season on four-wheel-drive cars.
 2004–2005: National Class Champion of the N 1.6 Trophy in the Romanian Championship (VW Polo); class winner (N2) at Waldviertel Rally, Austria in 2004, a round of the FIA European Championship.
 2003: 3rd place in the group H of the Romanian Rally Championship (Renault 5 GT Turbo).
 2001–2002: took part in selected rounds of the National Championship (group H), recording some podium finishes (Renault 5 GT Turbo and Opel Corsa GTI).
 2000: vice-champion of the rookie challenge in the Romanian Rally Championship (Opel Corsa GTI).
 1996–1997: Rallycross – (Opel Rekord)

WRC results

References

External links 
 Official Web-site Claudiu David's official website
 Claudiu David a castigat Raliul Clujului 2008 (Ro)
  CRR: Claudiu David a castigat Raliul Clujului Mobil 1 2008 (Ro)
 New Challenge For OMV Bixxol Rally Team
 Photos from the Rally Japan WRC 2007
  Two OMV BIXXOL Rally Teams in Rally Argentina WRC 2007
  Mihaela Beldie şi Claudiu David, învingători în Raliul Pietricica 2006 (Ro)

Romanian rally drivers
Year of birth missing (living people)
Living people